is a well-known Venezuelan folk song in the joropo tradition, composed by Juan Bautista Plaza with lyrics by Vicente Emilio Sojo.   

After its premiere in 1928 the piece became quite popular, in part because of its connection with joropo. It is lighter than much of Plaza's work; he never intended it to be viewed as art music, but as a popular piece, and later referred to it as "a little youthful sin."

It has been performed by singer Jesús Sevillano, the Quinteto Contrapunto vocal ensemble, and flutist Huáscar Barradas, among others.

Lyrics

See also
Venezuela
Venezuelan music
Juan Bautista Plaza

References

Spanish-language songs
Venezuelan songs